Chillicothe is a city in and the county seat of Ross County, Ohio, United States. Located along the Scioto River 45 miles (72 km) south of Columbus, Chillicothe was the first and third capital of Ohio. It is the only city in Ross County and is the center of the Chillicothe micropolitan area. The population was 22,059 at the 2020 census. Chillicothe is a designated Tree City USA by the National Arbor Day Foundation.

History
The region around Chillicothe was the center of the ancient Hopewell tradition, which flourished from 200 BC until 500 AD.  This Amerindian culture had trade routes extending to the Rocky Mountains.  They built earthen mounds for ceremonial and burial purposes throughout the Scioto and Ohio River valleys.

Later Native Americans who inhabited the area through the time of European contact included Shawnees. Present-day Chillicothe is the most recent of seven locations in Ohio that bore the name, because it was applied to the main town wherever the Chalakatha settled.

In 1758 a settlement was established at this site by Shawnee Indians who had been forced to abandon their village of Lower Shawneetown after it was destroyed by floods in November of that year. A group of Shawnees from Logstown also joined them.

After the Treaty of Greenville in 1795 forced the Native Americans from most of Ohio, European settlers came to the area.  Migrants from Virginia and Kentucky moved west along the Ohio River in search of land. The community Chillicothe was founded in 1796 by a party led by General Nathaniel Massie on his land grant. The town's name comes from the Shawnee Chala·ka·tha (Chillicothe in English), meaning "principal town", because it was the chief settlement of that division (one of five major divisions) of the Shawnee people.

In 1798, Ross County became incorporated with Chillicothe as the county seat.  Chillicothe was named the capital of the remnant Northwest Territory in 1800, when Indiana Territory was split off, and the Northwest Territory was reduced to Ohio, eastern Michigan and a sliver of southeastern Indiana. In 1802 as Ohio moved toward statehood, the city hosted the Ohio Constitutional Convention.  It served as the capital of Ohio from statehood in 1803 until 1810 then again from 1812 to 1816.

Ohio was a free state, and early migrants to Chillicothe included free blacks, who came to a place with fewer restrictions than in the slave states.  They created a vibrant community and aided runaway slaves coming north.  As tensions increased prior to the breakout of the American Civil War, the free black community at Chillicothe maintained stations and aid to support refugees on the Underground Railroad.  The Ohio River was a border with the slave states of the South, with slaves crossing the river to freedom, and then up the Scioto River to get more distance from their former homes and slave hunters.  White abolitionists aided the Underground Railroad as well.

Geography

Chillicothe is located at  (39.336525, −82.983822). It lies within the ecoregion of the Western Allegheny Plateau. It lies between the Scioto River and Paint Creek near their confluence.

The city is surrounded by farming communities, and Chillicothe residents describe the area as the foothills of the Appalachians

Climate
The climate is very similar if not the same to Columbus.

Economy
As the only city in the area, Chillicothe is a hub for economic activity. Malls, hospitals, prisons and a college campus are among the largest employers, but the most notable employer in the area is a Pixelle paper mill (formerly Glatfelter which was formerly Mead Paper) that has been in operation for over 100 years.

Demographics

2020 census 
As of the census of 2020, there were 22,059 people, 9,576 occupied housing units, and 5,589 families residing in the city. Of the 9,576 households, 2,856 were occupied by a married couple family, 191 had a male householder with no spouse present, and 545 had a female householder with no spouse present. Of the 5,589 families, 37.7% were married couple families living together, 36.9% had a female householder with no spouse present, and 17.1% had a male householder with no spouse present. The average family size was 2.95.

Of the 22,059 people, 18,892 were White, 1,348 were Black or African American, 88 were American Indian and Alaska Native, 155 were Asian, 351 were Hispanic or Latino, 6 were Native Hawaiian and Pacific Islanders, 1,419 were two or more races, and 151 were other races.

The median age in the city was 41.4 years. 7.0% of resident were under the age of 5; 21.1% were under the age of 18; 78.9% were 18 years and over; and 20.6% were 65 years of age or older.

The median income for a household in the city was $45,251, and the median income for a family was $66,224. About 18.1% of the population were below the poverty line, with 25.5% of them being under 18 years old, 18.4% being 18 to 64 years old, and 9.5% being 65 years and over.

2010 census
As of the census of 2010, there were 21,901 people, 9,420 households, and 5,559 families residing in the city. The racial makeup of the city was 88.1% White, 7.2% African American, 0.3% Native American, 0.5% Asian, 0.5% from other races, and 3.4% from two or more races. Hispanic or Latino of any race were 1.3% of the population.

There were 9,420 households, of which 27.5% had children under the age of 18 living with them, 39.1% were married couples living together, 14.9% had a female householder with no spouse present, 5.0% had a male householder with no spouse present, and 41.0% were non-families. 34.6% of all households were made up of individuals, and 14.3% had someone living alone who was 65 years of age or older. The average household size was 2.25 and the average family size was 2.87.

The median age in the city was 41.5 years. 21.8% of residents were under the age of 18; 7.7% were between the ages of 18 and 24; 24.8% were from 25 to 44; 27.8% were from 45 to 64; and 17.9% were 65 years of age or older. The gender makeup of the city was 47.6% male and 52.4% female.

2000 census
As of the census of 2000, there were 21,796 people, 9,481 households, and 5,754 families residing in the city. The population density was 2,283.7 people per square mile (882.1/km2). There were 10,303 housing units at an average density of 1,079.5 per square mile (417.0/km2). The racial makeup of the city was 89.21% White, 7.51% African American, 0.34% Native American, 0.56% Asian, 0.04% Pacific Islander, 0.35% from other races, and 2.00% from two or more races. Hispanic or Latino of any race were 0.84% of the population.

There were 9,481 households, out of which 25.8% had children under the age of 18 living with them, 43.5% were married couples living together, 13.3% had a female householder with no spouse present, and 39.3% were non-families. 34.3% of all households were made up of individuals, and 14.8% had someone living alone who was 65 years of age or older. The average household size was 2.24 and the average family size was 2.85.

In the city the population was spread out, with 22.2% under the age of 18, 8.4% from 18 to 24, 27.1% from 25 to 44, 24.1% from 45 to 64, and 18.2% who were 65 years of age or older. The median age was 40 years. For every 100 females, there were 88.1 males. For every 100 females age 18 and over, there were 83.3 males.

The median income for a household in the city was $33,991, and the median income for a family was $42,477. Males had a median income of $35,199 versus $25,010 for females. The per capita income for the city was $19,101. About 9.3% of families and 12.4% of the population were below the poverty line, including 14.3% of those under age 18 and 9.3% of those age 65 or over.

Government

Public officials
Chillicothe is governed by a mayor–council structure in which the mayor is elected separately from the members of the city council. Chillicothe's mayor is Luke Feeney (D). The members of the city council are:

The following individuals were elected to the City Council on Tuesday, November 2, 2021, and have since been added to the council members list seen above.

Allison Henderson (R)
Julie Preston (R)
Terrell Fairrow (R)

Henderson and Fairrow defeated Democratic Incumbents Courtney Lewis and David Tatman, respectively.

Other elected officials

Public services

Parks and recreation
Chillicothe has several public parks, including Yoctangee Park, Poland Park, Strawser Park, Manor Park, Goldie Gunlock Park, Pine Street Park, Veterans Memorial Park, and Western View Park.

The biggest park, Yoctangee Park, consists of numerous baseball /softball fields, tennis courts, basketball courts, and playground equipment. There is also a skatepark within Yoctangee park called Henry Good skatepark, which was constructed with help from a generous donation of $65,000 from Henry Good, a local Chillicothe citizen.

Chillicothe's floodwall, protecting the city from floods of the Scioto River, has a 5.0-mile-long paved bike path.  This path connects to the Tri-County Triangle Trail which currently is 30.3 miles long, measured from Bridge St. (SR 159) in Chillicothe, passing through Frankfort and then to Christman Park near Washington Court House in Fayette County, Ohio.  The Tri-County Triangle Trail's goal is to connect Chillicothe and Greenfield.  This same former railroad continues to Jamestown and Xenia, but those connections are a long range plan.

Hopewell Culture National Historical Park is found on the north end of the city.  The park is administered by the National Park Service and has a large concentration of Native American earthworks.

Education
A branch of Ohio University, Ohio University Chillicothe is a public four-year institution that offers 13 associate degree programs and 12 bachelor's degree programs. About 2,000 students are enrolled each year.

The city of Chillicothe provides education for pre-school through grade 12 students. The Chillicothe City School District includes the following facilities:  Chillicothe Primary School; Chillicothe Intermediate School; Chillicothe Middle School; and Chillicothe High School Zane Trace k-12. Additionally,  Bishop Flaget Catholic School, the parish school of St. Mary's and St. Peter's Catholic Churches, offers an academic program with the faith-based component to both Catholic and non-Catholic families for students in Prekindergarten through 8th grade. There was once a school called Wesley-Taylor Preparatory Academy which offered a private education, but it shut down in 2014 due to unpaid bills. Ross County Christian Academy was formed in 2007 and now offers K through 12th grade at two sites.

Chillicothe is the home of Pickaway-Ross Career & Technology Center, located at 895 Crouse Chapel Road. Founded in 1974, Pickaway-Ross Career & Technology Center (or Pickaway-Ross) is the operational arm of the Pickaway-Ross Joint Vocational School District. Pickaway-Ross offers 20 high school tech-prep programs to students from 10 high schools in Ross and Pickaway counties. High school students attend Pickaway-Ross their junior and senior years, and can earn a Career Passport in addition to a diploma from their home schools. The high school (or secondary education) side of Pickaway-Ross serves approximately 600 students on its main campus and another 1,500 students in off-campus (or satellite) programs housed in affiliated high schools. School districts affiliated with Pickaway-Ross include: Adena, Chillicothe, Huntington, Paint Valley, Southeastern, Unioto, and Zane Trace in Ross County, and Circleville, Logan Elm and Westfall in Pickaway County. In addition to high school programs, Pickaway-Ross boasts a full-service Adult Education Division, offering a wide array of programs in skilled trades, public safety and medical services fields, to name a few. Pickaway-Ross is a regional leader in career tech education.

Chillicothe is also home to the Recording Workshop, an audio engineering school.

Chillicothe city is served by the main branch and Northside branch of Chillicothe & Ross County Public Library.

Culture

Majestic Theatre
Chillicothe is home to the 158-year-old continuously operating Majestic Theatre.  Its stage has been graced by such greats as Laurel and Hardy, Milton Berle, George Arliss, Sophie Tucker, Bob Hope and many others.  In 1853 the Masonic Hall was built, as the first incarnation of what is now the Majestic Theatre. 
The two-story brick building was a combination lodge room, dance hall, and theater. Stock companies stayed for as long as a month, performing a repertory of plays. In 1876 the Masons appointed a building committee to enlarge their building. Upon completion in December 1876 it was announced that the Masonic Opera House was one of the finest theaters in the state. After the remodeling and with the completion of the Clough Opera House across the city, theater offerings were tremendous, and varied drama, comedy, farce, minstrel shows, and operas were presented.

In 1904 A. R. Wolf bought the Masonic Opera House. Mr. Wolf remodeled the theater and enlarged the stage.  He replaced all the windows in the front of the building with stained glass. The Masonic Opera House continued under Wolf's managerial abilities until he sold it to the Myers Brothers in 1914. They again made some improvements and repairs and installed a movie screen and equipment. The Myers Brothers changed the name to the Majestic Theatre.  They occasionally had live theater productions on the stage but finally switched exclusively to motion pictures. 
In July 1971, Harley and Evelyn Bennett became the new owners of the Majestic Theatre. They did careful restoration with reference to the original wall painting.
Three Chillicothe businessmen (Robert Evans, Robert Althoff and David Uhrig) bought the theater as a non-profit organization in 1990. All new wiring throughout the theater, fire safety, and security systems were installed.

Fairs and festivals

Chillicothe, rich in Native American history, hosts the annual Feast of the Flowering Moon Festival. Started in 1984, the May festival draws crowds of approximately 85,000. Yoctangee Park, in the historic downtown, is the setting for this family-oriented, three-day event featuring Native American music, dancing, traders and exhibits, a mountain men encampment, rendezvous with working craftsmen and demonstrations, and an extensive arts and crafts show with more than 80 crafters and commercial exhibits.  The main stage has a schedule of family-friendly entertainment, such as local school bands and performers.  The streets are lined with food booths and games/contests.  Events are free to the public.

In September, on the Friday and Saturday after Labor Day, Chillicothe hosts the annual Southern Ohio Storytelling Festival. The festival features concert performances by several highly acclaimed and award-winning storytellers.  Storytelling concerts are held throughout the day on both Friday and Saturday. Thousands of students participate during the day on Friday in various venues, including the Majestic Theatre, a tent at the Pump House Art Gallery in Yoctangee Park, and local school auditoriums.

Athletic events
The Chillicothe Paints are a baseball team that was established in February 1993. The team was previously a member of the Frontier League, playing there from its founding until 2008.  They were one of the original teams in the league.  The Paints are now a member of the summer collegiate Prospect League, The Paints play their home games at V.A. Memorial Stadium, which opened in 1954.

V.A. Memorial Stadium has hosted a number of other events, including the Mid-American Conference baseball tournament from 2008 to 2011, along with high soccer and baseball playoff games for the Ohio High School Athletic Association (OHSAA).

Notable people

 Thomas M. Anderson, U.S. Army major general
 Scott Bailes, former Major League Baseball player
 Carrie Williams Clifford, poet, activist, teacher and editor
 Edward Cook, pole vaulter who competed at 1908 Summer Olympics and tied for gold with fellow American Alfred Gilbert
 Greg Cook, Cincinnati Bengals quarterback
 Lawrence Dixon, musician
 Richard Enderlin  Musician and Medal of Honor recipient
 Martha Finley, teacher, author
 Bobby Fulton, professional wrestler
 Joseph Hanks, Civil War Medal of Honor awardee
 Ben Hartsock, Former Ohio State University and NFL tight end, Current ESPN Radio analyst
 Lucy Ware Hayes (née Webb; August 28, 1831 – June 25, 1889) was the wife of President Rutherford B. Hayes and served as First Lady of the United States.
 James Leo Herlihy, who wrote the novel the film Midnight Cowboy is based on, spent part of his childhood in Chillicothe.
 Albert E. Herrnstein, University of Michigan football player, Head Coach of the Ohio State University football team
 John Herrnstein, Philadelphia Phillies, University of Michigan football and baseball player
 Neil Johnston, NBA All-Star basketball player
 Alexander Bonner Latta, invented first successful steam fire engine
 James Mason, neo-Nazi and author of Siege
 Dorothea Rhodes Lummis Moore (1857–1942), physician, writer, newspaper editor, activist
 Chip Mosher, teacher, author, newspaper/magazine columnist 
 Elbie Nickel, Pittsburgh Steelers tight end
 Nellie O'Donnell, educator
 Henry Orth, football player
 Oscar Glaze Peters, businessman
 John Poff, MLB player for the Philadelphia Phillies and Milwaukee Brewers
 Ev Rowan, football player
 John Shoemaker, pro baseball player and minor-league manager
 Noel Sickles, commercial illustrator and cartoonist, best known for the comic strip Scorchy Smith
 Joshua W. Sill, brigadier general during the American Civil War
 Joseph S. Skerrett, United States Navy rear admiral
 Jimmy Strausbaugh, football player
 Tecumseh, influential Native American who was likely born in the area was instrumental in the political developments and resistance of Native Americans to new settlements.
 Garin Veris, defensive end, New England Patriots, Stanford University
 Nancy Wilson, Grammy award-winning artist who performed hit song "Guess Who I Saw Today"
 Jane Frances Winn, called the "dean of newspaper women" in St. Louis, was at the beginning of her career teacher of botany and chemistry in the local high school

Sister city
 Chillicothe is the sister city of Córdoba, Veracruz, Mexico. This relationship is honored through the Foreign Exchange Student Program with students at Chillicothe High School.
 Chillicothe had an agreement with the sister city of Tulua, Valle del Cauca, Colombia. For this reason, the main lake in the city is called Lago Chilicote.

See also
 Great Hopewell Road

Notes

References

External links

 City website
 Pat Medert, "Chillicothe History"
 Chillicothe Gazette
 Downtown information
 Chamber of Commerce
 Chillicothe & Ross County Public Library 
 Ross County Visitor's Bureau

 
Cities in Ohio
Cities in Ross County, Ohio
County seats in Ohio
Ohio
Populated places established in 1803
Populated places on the Underground Railroad
1803 establishments in Ohio